The Apartment Window is an early 20th century painting by American artist Jeannette Scott. Done in oil on canvas, the work depicts a hatted woman in a yellow dress set before a window. The painting is in the collection of Vose Galleries in Boston, Massachusetts.

References

1926 paintings
American paintings